The Slovakia–Ukraine border is an internationally established boundary between Slovakia and Ukraine. Both countries inherited it from their previous respective state organizations, Ukraine from the Soviet Union and Slovakia from Czechoslovakia.

After the admission of Slovakia to the European Union, the border became the external border of the European Union. Ukraine's Uzhhorod Airport is located just a few hundred metres from the border.

Border checkpoints

Border checkpoints are the following:
Road

Rail

Others

In 2008 the border was crossed by some 2.8 million people and over 1.5 million transportation objects.

See also
 State Border of Ukraine
 Slovakia–Ukraine relations

References

External links
 Ministry of Interior of the Slovak Republic: Border crossing points
 КОРДОНІ З СЛОВАЦЬКОЮ РЕСПУБЛІКОЮ ПУНКТИ ПРОПУСКУ ЧЕРЕЗ ДЕРЖАВНИЙ КОРДОН УКРАЇНИ

 
European Union external borders
Borders of Slovakia
Borders of Ukraine
International borders